The Australian Space Office (ASO) was an agency formed by the Hawke Government in 1987 to oversee the National Space Program. The office worked on the initiative along with the Australian Space Board, later the Australian Space Council. As part of the larger National Space Program, the ASO was established specifically to act as the secretariat and day-to-day manager of the advisory decisions made by the ASB/ASC. The office was abolished in 1996 by the Howard Government after a review by the Bureau of Industry Economics.

Development 
The ASO's primary defined function was to oversee development of an export-oriented commercial space industry within Australia, focusing on five main sectors:

 Space Projects, overseeing the development and launch of NSP funded space programs,
 Launch Services, responsible for overseeing the numerous private space launch facility proposals that arose in the 1980s and 90s,
 Space Policy, responsible for developing space policy aside the ASB/ASC
 NASA Administration, which handled all Australian collaboration with NASA
 and the Canberra Deep Space Communication Complex, a major tracking and communication satellite complex located in Tidbinbilla, Canberra.

During the years it existed, the ASO oversaw the development of a satellite and a proposed spaceport. The spaceport was an initiative to develop a commercial rocket launchpad in Cape York Peninsula, Queensland, however it ultimately never came to fruition.

See also

 National Space Program

References 

Space agencies
Space programme of Australia
1987 establishments in Australia
Government agencies established in 1987
Defunct Commonwealth Government agencies of Australia
1996 disestablishments in Australia